Bidhannagar City Police (Bengali: বিধাননগর সিটি পুলিশ), established on 20 January 2012, is a police force with primary responsibilities in law enforcement and investigation within Bidhannagar Municipal Corporation and certain adjacent areas in Greater Kolkata (Saltlake, Lake Town, Kestopur, Baguiati, Raghunathpur, Teghoria, Arjunpur, Kaikhali, Rajarhat, New Town, Dumdum/Kolkata Airport Area, Inside of NSCBI Airport, Gouripur, Michael Nagar, Ganganagar). The Commissionerate is part of the West Bengal Police and is under the administrative control of Home Ministry of West Bengal. It was formed after bifurcation of the North 24 Parganas Police District, and has eleven police stations under its jurisdiction. Shri Gaurav Sharma is the current Commissioner of the Bidhannagar City Police. Shri Rajeev Kumar was the first commissioner of Bidhan Nagar City Police.

Structure and jurisdiction

The Police commissionerate is situated at Bidhannagar and is divided into three divisions-

Bidhannagar Division, Newtown Division , Airport Division. As like Kolkata Traffic Police, Only Bidhan Nagar City Traffic Police has traffic guards offices headed by an Officer-In-Charge. Bidhannaagar City Police is headed by the Commissioner of Police, who is an Indian Police Service officer in the rank of Inspector-General of Police (IGP). The commissioner is assisted by deputy commissioners. Other departments, including the detective department and the special branch wing are headed by Additional deputy commissioners, who are in the rank of additional superintendent of police. The police stations are headed by an Officer-In-Charge, an Inspector rank officer.

Police stations
 On 27 November 2019, 2 new police station Eco Park and Technocity was inaugurated after dividing New Town Police Station.

 Airport PS
 Baguiati PS
 Bidhannagar East PS
 Bidhannagar North PS
 Bidhannagar South PS
 Eco Park PS
 Electronics Complex PS
 Lake Town PS
 Narayanpur PS
 New Town PS
 NSCBI Airport PS
 Rajarhat PS
 Technocity PS

Specialised Police Stations

1.Bidhannagar Cyber Crime PS
2.Bidhannagar Women PS

Traffic Guards
 
 1. Airport Traffic Guard
 2. Baguiati Traffic Guard
 3. Kaikhali Traffic Guard
 4.Rajarhat Traffic Guard
 5. Bidhannagar Traffic Guard
 6. Lake Town Traffic Guard
 7. New Town Traffic Guard
 8. Nabadiganta Sector - V Traffic Guard
 9. NSCBI Traffic Guard

See also
 Barrackpore Police Commissionerate
 Howrah Police Commissionerate
 Chandannagar Police Commissionerate
 Kolkata Police
 Police Commissioner of Kolkata

External links
 Official website

References 

Metropolitan law enforcement agencies of India
Government of Kolkata
West Bengal Police
Police Commissionerate in West Bengal
2012 establishments in West Bengal
Government agencies established in 2012